On February 24, 2012, 14-year-old Gabriela Yukari Nichimura died after falling from the drop tower, because its lock opened at about  high. The problem was in Gabriela's chair which had been unused for 10 years, due to the seat's location where a person could bump into the metal frame of the drop tower, in addition to the absence of a seat belt. The park closed hours after the accident. A full review that began on March 2 of the same year was performed on all rides. Upon completion of the review and signing of a Conduct Adjustment Term (CAT), the park was reopened on March 25, 2012, but the tower remained banned.

La Tour Eiffel is a drop tower of the Hopi Hari amusement park in Vinhedo, São Paulo. It opened along with the park on November 30, 1999.

At the time, the family had plans to sue the park for material and moral damage. Gabriela's family even asked for R$ 4 million in compensation from Hopi Hari and R$ 1 million from Vinhedo City Hall.

On May 9, 2012, the Public Prosecution Service indicted 12 people for the accident, including the then president of the park, Armando Pereira Filho. The park even tried to make a deal with the family.

In 2017, three employees were convicted of manslaughter for two years and eight months of community service and the payment of a minimum wage for a social entity. Another five employees were acquitted. In the civil sphere, the family and the park came to an undisclosed agreement.

On May 18, 2017, the Supreme Federal Court discontinued a lawsuit against former President Armando Pereira Filho. The family is treated for what happened.

Reopening
After changes in the drop tower, it was estimated to be back in August 2019, but in June 2019 the management decided against its reopening, due to the need for US$ to recover the equipment and the realization of marketing.

References

Notes 
1. Hours in UTC-2 (Daylight saving time).

Drop tower rides
Towers in Brazil
Eiffel Tower reproductions
Buildings and structures in São Paulo (state)